Louis Hector Leroux (27 December 1829, Verdun - 11 November 1900, Angers) was a French painter in the academic style.

Life
Training as a wigmaker, he briefly worked in that profession in his birthplace at the same time as taking a drawing course in the town's art college, winning all its art prizes. These prizes earned Leroux a small bursary to go to Paris to study further, and he entered the École nationale supérieure des Beaux-Arts in 1849. He studied in the studio of François-Édouard Picot, producing copies of illustrations and museum works to supplement his income. He won the second prize in the Prix de Rome in 1857, staying in Rome from then until 1874. Shortly after his arrival in Rome the French state commissioned him to produce a painted copy of Titian's Sacred and Profane Love, whilst he later also produced copies for the Gobelins manufactory. He travelled from Rome to the rest of Italy, to Greece, Asia Minor, Turkey and Egypt, making occasional return trips to Paris.  From 1863 onwards he painted almost solely classical subjects, along with occasional historical or biblical subjects. His daughter Laura Leroux was also a painter.

Selected works
1859 - Coriolanus Against the Volscians, Musée de la Princerie, Verdun
1860 - Banquet Scene, Musée de la Princerie, Verdun
1863 - A New Vestal Virgin (Verdun, Mus. Princerie), his debut Salon piece
Roman Ladies at the Tomb of their Ancestors (New York, Metropolitan Museum)
1869 - Miracle of the Good Goddess (1869; Ajaccio, Mus. Fesch)
1878 - Mother and Son of the Columbarium on the Appian Way in Rome, Musée de la Princerie, Verdun
1879 - Vestal Mauiden Asleep in a Chair, Metropolitan Museum of Art, New York
1881 - Herculaneum, August 23, 79 AD, Musée d'Orsay, Paris
1881 - Portrait of Laura in Vestal Virgin, Musée de la Princerie, Verdun
1883 - Sacrarium (sacristie), Musée de la Princerie, Verdun
1885 - Mysterious Stone of Pompei, Musée de la Princerie, Verdun
1888 - Brother and Sister, Musée de la Princerie, Verdun
1888 - Sapho and Mitylene, Musée de la Princerie, Verdun
1891 - Three Lectures, Musée de la Princerie, Verdun
Aurelia, Musée de la Princerie, Verdun
The Heart of the House of Hector Leroux in Italy,  Musée de la Princerie, Verdun
Portrait of a Woman (several paintings including one from 1881), Musée de la Princerie, Verdun 
Régina, Musée de la Princerie, Verdun
Keeper of the Flame, private collection, Raleigh, North Carolina

External links

http://www.answers.com/topic/leroux-louis-hector
http://www.artnet.com/artist/645425/louis-hector-leroux.html
http://www.victorianweb.org/painting/france/leroux1.html

1829 births
1900 deaths
19th-century French painters
French male painters
People from Meuse (department)
19th-century French male artists